Taylor Creek is a census-designated place (CDP) in Colerain Township, Hamilton County, Ohio, United States. The population was 4,056 at the 2020 census.

History
Taylor Creek was originally known as Sheartown in the 19th century.

Geography
It occupies the southwestern portion of Colerain Township, bounded on the west and north by the Great Miami River.

This area was all land.

Demographics

References

Census-designated places in Hamilton County, Ohio
Census-designated places in Ohio